Nitella mucronata is a species of stonewort belonging to the family Characeae.

It has cosmopolitan distribution.

References

Charophyta